This is a record of Israel at the 2003 World Championships in Athletics.

Women's 400 metres

Heats

Semifinals

Women's 100 metres hurdles

Heats

Semifinals

Women's 4 × 400 metres relay

Heat 3

Men's marathon

Men's pole vault

Qualification

Men's javelin throw

Qualification - Group B

Women's heptathlon

Nations at the 2003 World Championships in Athletics
World Championships in Athletics
2003